Wiktoria "Viki" Gabor (born 10 July 2007) is a Polish singer. She began her career in 2019, as a runner-up on the second season of The Voice Kids Poland, and then later won the Junior Eurovision Song Contest 2019 with the song "Superhero". She is the second Polish entrant to win the contest, and her win marked the first time a country had won the contest twice in a row, and on homesoil.

Early life
Gabor was born in Hamburg to a Polish Romani family. After her birth, they returned to Poland, later moving to the United Kingdom, and then settling in Kraków when she was seven. Gabor has an elder sister named Melisa, who is a composer and songwriter.

Career

2019–present: The Voice Kids Poland, Junior Eurovision, and breakthrough
In late-2018, Gabor competed in the auditions for second season of The Voice Kids Poland. She joined the team of Tomson & Baron, and proceeded to continue to advance through the competition, ultimately reaching the finals and releasing her debut single "Time".

After The Voice Kids, Gabor was selected to perform "Time" at Young Choice Awards of the Top of the Top Sopot Festival 2019. Afterwards, she was selected to compete in the rebooted Szansa na sukces, which was being used to select the Polish representative for the Junior Eurovision Song Contest 2019. Gabor advanced to the finals, where she ultimately was declared the winner with the song "Superhero". Junior Eurovision was held on 24 November in Gliwice. Gabor performed eleventh in the competition, and ultimately won the competition, placing second with the professional juries and scoring the highest with the online fan vote. This win marked Gabor as the second Polish entrant to ever win the Junior Eurovision Song Contest, the first time a performer representing the host-nation won Junior Eurovision, and made Poland the first country to win the contest twice in a row.

Since Junior Eurovision 2019, Gabor has released several singles, including "Ramię w ramię" with Kayah and "Getaway" in late April 2020. As part of a collaborative album with other child singers Roksana Węgiel, Marcin Maciejczak, Zuza Jabłońska and group 4dreamers, Gabor released her song "Still Standing" (co-written by herself and her sister Melisa). Gabor also released her single "Forever and a Night" in July 2020. In August 2020, she released "Not Gonna Get It", the last single from her debut album to be released before its première.

On 10 July 2020, her birthday, Gabor announced her first album (available September 4, 2020). This album is titled "Getaway (Into My Imagination)". Gabor has many views on YouTube, Spotify, and other platforms. She also has a Facebook page, with over 20,000 likes. She is frequently featured on playlists such as Spotify's 'Hity lata 2020' and Digster Polska's Spotify playlist 'POPSztos'.

At the Junior Eurovision Song Contest 2020, hosted in Poland for the second consecutive year following her win, Gabor performed the song "Arcade" as an interval act, together with previous Polish Junior Eurovision winner Roksana Węgiel and Eurovision 2019 winner Duncan Laurence.

In August 2021, she signed a recording contract with Sony Music Entertainment Poland and announced the release of the single "Moonlight," which was released on September 3. In October, she became the face of ING Bank Śląski's advertising campaign titled Find Your Stage. On November 26, she released a music video for the single "Toxic Love." On February 4, 2022, she released the single "Napad na serce". In the spring of 2022, she took part in the sixteenth edition of the Polsat television entertainment program Your Face Sounds Familiar; after nine episodes, she reached the finals, where she placed fourth. On May 21, she performed during the Polsat SuperHit Festival 2022. On June 24, she performed a duet with Armenian singer and winner of Junior Eurovision 2022 Maléna, during the European Stadium of Culture in Rzeszów, singing Summer Walker's song "Girls Need Love."

Personal life
Polish media have depicted Gabor and fellow young Polish singer Roksana Węgiel (also a winner of Junior Eurovision) as being in a rivalry. Both singers have denied these claims, with Viki describing Roksana as 'a great girl'. On September 18, 2020, her father was confirmed to have been attacked in the Mokotów district of Warsaw.

Discography

Studio albums

Extended plays

Singles

Promotional singles

Awards and nominations

Notes

References

External links

2007 births
21st-century Polish singers
21st-century Polish women singers
Child pop musicians
Junior Eurovision Song Contest entrants
Junior Eurovision Song Contest winners
Living people
Polish expatriates in the United Kingdom
Polish child singers
Polish pop singers
Polish Romani people
Musicians from Kraków
The Voice Kids contestants